Balozi Dola,  Balozi or Dolasoul, is a self-proclaimed “socially conscious” hip hop artist from Tanzania.

Biography

Early years
Balozi began his career while attending school in Nigeria. Balozi grew up with the support of his family who put education first. Seeing education as the key to an improved life, rapping began as something that was fun, and was not initially seen as a career. After studying in the UK, Balozi returned to Tanzania and became a hip hop artist.

Musical career
Upon returning to Tanzania, Balozi joined the rap group the Deplowmatz, whose other members were both sons of Tanzanian diplomats. The group was named the best rap group in Tanzania in 1999.

and had a song at the top of the music charts in the Netherlands. Balozi's music focuses on the political, economic, social, and cultural problems facing the people of Tanzania. He has released two albums and has performed in many venues throughout Europe, Africa, and North America.

Discography
Dolasoul (Balozi Wenu). "Dolasoul". Manu Stores cassette. Tanga, Tanzania. c. 1995.
Balozi Dola - Kwenye Chati

References

External links
Balozi Dola Songs

Year of birth missing (living people)
Living people
Tanzanian rappers
 Tanzanian hip hop musicians
 Tanzanian Bongo Flava musicians
 Swahili-language singers